The 1896 Swarthmore Quakers football team was an American football team that represented Swarthmore College as an independent during the 1896 college football season. The team compiled a 2–6 record and was outscored by a total of 110 to 76. Jacob K. Shell was the head coach.  Hodge was the captain and quarterback.

Schedule

References

Swarthmore
Swarthmore Garnet Tide football seasons
Swarthmore Quakers football